Les Trois Accords is a Canadian rock band from Drummondville, Québec. The band launched its first album, Gros Mammouth Album, in 2003. Some of the songs from that album, include "Hawaïenne", "Saskatchewan" and "Lucille". Their videos and songs received exposure in Quebec. In 2004, Gros Mammouth Album Turbo (certified Platinum by the CRIA) was released with two extra tracks, "Loin d'ici" and "Turbo Sympathique". In 2006, they released their second album, entitled Grand champion international de course (certified Gold by the CRIA).

The song "Lucille" was included in a podcast, released by bandeapart.fm in 2005. In 2006, bandeapart.fm featured the band in a video podcast, Les Trois Accords au camping, Baladovidéo.

In September 2005, they were an opening act for The Rolling Stones in Moncton, New Brunswick. The concert drew an estimated 75,000 spectators.

Originally formed in 1997 by Olivier Benoit and Simon Proulx, the band's current members are:

Pierre-Luc Boisvert (Bass; Joined in 2001)
Charles Dubreuil (Drums and percussion; Joined in 2001)
Alexandre Parr (Guitars, vocals; Joined in 1999)
Simon Proulx (Vocalist, guitars)

Founding member Olivier Benoit left in 2009 to become the group's manager.

 Musical style 
The second album from Les Trois Accords was released September 5, 2006. This album did not break with the rock-pop style of Gros Mammouth and was more outrageous in its lyrics. The music video for Grand Champion can be viewed at Bande à part. The second music video is "Tout nu sur la plage". The album rose to the top of the charts after its first week.

Many of their newer songs can be classified as surrealist because of the frequent presence of puns, word play, and unusual images.

 Genre classification 
Free from logic, rationality, and politics, the lyrics of Les Trois Accords are a throwback to the punk québécois genre of the nineties (like Banlieue Rouge, BARF, Les Krostons, Les Unknownes).

Les Trois Accords can be classified along the same lines as French punk bands like Bérurier Noir, Parabellum, Les Cadavres or Les Wampas (all well known in Québec), but with a more California-pop sound. We can compare them more to Ludwig von 88 because of their obnoxious interviews—most notably, their interviews for Tout le monde en parle, Bon baisers de France, and Musique Plus. Les Trois Accords have had complaints about their lyrics before expressing their opinions, but they believe that expressing themselves inspires them.

 Discography 

 Studio albums 
 Gros mammouth album (2003)
 Gros mammouth album turbo (2004) (updated version)
 Grand champion international de course (2006)
 En beau country (2008)
 Dans mon corps (2009)
 J'aime ta grand-mère (2012)
 Joie d'être gai (2015)
 Beaucoup de plaisir (2018)
 Présence D'esprit'' (2022)

See also 
List of Quebec musicians

References

External links 
   

Musical groups established in 1997
Musical groups from Montreal
Canadian alternative rock groups
1997 establishments in Quebec